The Hendrie Stakes is a Thoroughbred horse race run annually at Woodbine Racetrack in Toronto, Ontario, Canada. Held in mid May, the Grade III sprint race is open to fillies and mares, aged four and older and is contested over a distance of six and a half furlongs on Polytrack synthetic dirt. It offers a purse of $116,205 with an additional $50,000 for Ontario-bred horses provided by the Canadian Thoroughbred Horse Society (CTHS) through its Thoroughbred Improvement Program (TIP).
 
It was inaugurated in 1975 and run at the Fort Erie Racetrack for the first two years as the George C. Hendrie Handicap in honor of George Campbell Hendrie. The Hendrie's have been called one of Canada's most prominent racing families who, as did George Hendrie's father and grandfather before him, served as president of the Ontario Jockey Club.

Records
Speed  record: 
 1:14.54 - Fatal Bullet (2008)
 1:15.28 - Cactus Kris
 1:15.60 - Eseni (1997)
 1:15.66 - El Prado Essence (2003)

Most wins:
 2 - La Voyageuse (1979, 1980
 2 - El Prado Essence (2002, 2003)

Most wins by an owner:
 4 - Knob Hill Stable (1988, 1990, 1997, 2000)

Most wins by a jockey:
 5 - Patrick Husbands (2003, 2009, 2011, 2012, 2014) 
 5 - David Clark (1986, 1989, 2000, 2004, 2005)
 5 - Todd Kabel (1998, 1999, 2002, 2006, 2007)

Most wins by a trainer:
 4 - Mark E. Casse (2012, 2013, 2014, 2021)

Winners of the Hendrie Stakes

See also
 List of Canadian flat horse races

References
 The Hendrie Stakes at Pedigree Query

Graded stakes races in Canada
Sprint category horse races for fillies and mares
Recurring sporting events established in 1975
Woodbine Racetrack
1975 establishments in Ontario